In metric geometry, asymptotic dimension of a metric space is a large-scale analog of Lebesgue covering dimension.  The notion of asymptotic dimension was introduced by Mikhail Gromov in his 1993 monograph Asymptotic invariants of infinite groups in the context of geometric group theory, as a quasi-isometry invariant of finitely generated groups. As shown by Guoliang Yu, finitely generated groups of finite homotopy type with finite asymptotic dimension satisfy the Novikov conjecture.  Asymptotic dimension has important applications in geometric analysis and index theory.

Formal definition
Let  be a metric space and  be an integer. Here 'uniformly bounded' means that .

We then define the asymptotic dimension  as the smallest integer  such that , if at least one such  exists, and define  otherwise.

Examples

If  is a metric space of bounded diameter then .
.
.
.

Properties

If  is a subspace of a metric space , then .
 For any metric spaces  and  one has .
 If  then .
 If  is a coarse embedding (e.g. a quasi-isometric embedding), then .
 If  is a real tree then .
 Let  be a Lipschitz map from a geodesic metric space  to a metric space  . Suppose that for every  the set family  satisfies the inequality  uniformly. Then  See
 If  is a metric space with  then  admits a coarse (uniform) embedding into a Hilbert space.
 If  is a metric space of bounded geometry with  then  admits a coarse embedding into a product of  locally finite simplicial trees.

Asymptotic dimension in geometric group theory

Asymptotic dimension achieved particular prominence in geometric group theory after a 1998 paper of  Guoliang Yu
, which proved that if  is a finitely generated group of finite homotopy type (that is with a classifying space of the homotopy type of a finite CW-complex) such that , then  satisfies the Novikov conjecture.  As was subsequently shown, finitely generated groups with finite asymptotic dimension are topologically amenable, i.e. satisfy Guoliang Yu's Property A introduced in and equivalent to the exactness of the reduced C*-algebra of the group.

If  is a word-hyperbolic group then .
If  is relatively hyperbolic with respect to subgroups  each of which has finite asymptotic dimension then .
.
 If , where  are finitely generated, then .
 If  is the fundamental group of a finite graph of groups  with underlying graph  and finitely generated vertex groups, then 

 Mapping class groups of orientable finite type surfaces have finite asymptotic dimension.
Let  be a connected Lie group and let  be a finitely generated discrete subgroup. Then .

References

Further reading

Metric geometry
Geometric group theory